Irene Margreta Maria de Kok (born 29 August 1963 in Eindhoven, North Brabant) is a retired judoka from the Netherlands, who is a two-fold world-champion and represented Holland at the 1992 Summer Olympics in Barcelona, Spain.

There De Kok won the bronze medal in the women's half-heavyweight division (– 72 kg), alongside Laetitia Meignan from France. She was named Dutch Sportswoman of the Year in 1987 after having claimed her second world title.

References

External links
 
 Dutch Olympic Committee 
 

1963 births
Living people
Dutch female judoka
Judoka at the 1992 Summer Olympics
Olympic bronze medalists for the Netherlands
Olympic judoka of the Netherlands
Olympic medalists in judo
Sportspeople from Eindhoven
Medalists at the 1992 Summer Olympics
20th-century Dutch women
21st-century Dutch women